The Huntley Mountain Formation is a late Devonian and early Mississippian mapped bedrock unit in Pennsylvania, in the United States.

Description

The formation is composed of relatively soft grayish-red shale and olive-gray sandstone. It is located in north central Pennsylvania.

Haystacks
The Haystacks are enigmatic mounds of sandstone that outcrop in Loyalsock Creek south of Dushore in Sullivan County.  They are a single bed of quartz sandstone with an undulating upper surface with up to one meter relief.  The origin of the mounds is debatable.

Notable Exposures
 The type section of the formation is at Huntley Mountain in Lycoming County, Pennsylvania, on the mountainside just north of the village of Waterville.
 Base of the Loyalsock Creek gorge in Worlds End State Park
 Haystacks beds, also in Loyalsock Creek

Stratigraphy
Geologist William E. Edmunds argues that the Huntley Mountain Formation is laterally equivalent to the Rockwell Formation (originally described in West Virginia) and the Spechty Kopf Formation. He proposes that the Pocono Formation be reinstated as "the dominantly non-red, non-marine clastic sequence between the Catskill and Mauch Chunk Formations", with the Huntley Mountain, Beckville, Burgoon, Rockwell, Mt. Carbon, and Spechty Kopf Formations demoted to the status of members of the Pocono Formation. Other workers support this interpretation.

References

See also 
 Geology of Pennsylvania

Devonian System of North America
Mississippian United States
Sandstone formations of the United States
Shale formations of the United States
Devonian geology of Pennsylvania
Geologic formations of Pennsylvania